Niccolò Gitto (born 12 October 1986) is an Italian water polo player. He won the world title in 2012 and two Olympic medals in 2012 and 2016. In 2012 he received the Gold Collar of Sporting Merit from the Italian Olympic Committee. He is married to Victoria and has a son Leonardo.

See also
 List of Olympic medalists in water polo (men)
 List of world champions in men's water polo
 List of World Aquatics Championships medalists in water polo

References

External links

 

1986 births
Living people
Water polo players from Rome
Italian male water polo players
Water polo centre backs
Water polo players at the 2012 Summer Olympics
Water polo players at the 2016 Summer Olympics
Medalists at the 2012 Summer Olympics
Medalists at the 2016 Summer Olympics
Olympic silver medalists for Italy in water polo
Olympic bronze medalists for Italy in water polo
World Aquatics Championships medalists in water polo